Rita Kerr (October 29, 1925May 19, 2017) was an author of books for children and young adults. Works include The Good Old Days, Dearie Deer, Gray Eagle: The Story of a Creek Indian Boy, and The Texas Cowboy.

According to WorldCat, The Alamo cat is held by 683 libraries and Juan Seguin, a hero of Texas is held in 557; Girl of the Alamo is held by 534 libraries and Tex's tales  in 525.

References

1925 births
2017 deaths
People from Okmulgee, Oklahoma
Writers from Oklahoma
American children's writers
20th-century American educators
20th-century American women writers
21st-century American women